Managed decline is a phrase that refers to the management of the decline (or "sunset") phase at the end of a lifecycle, with the goal of minimizing costs or other forms of losses and harm. The concept originated in business where it referred to the management of companies and industries, but has since spread beyond to be used in other contexts.

Examples of managed decline include the handling of the textiles, shipbuilding, coal and steel industries in North America and Europe in the 1980s (in 1981, it was proposed for the English city of Liverpool by Chancellor Geoffrey Howe); of the postal delivery services in Europe and the United States in the first decades of the 21st century, 
of the established churches in western Europe since the 1970s, and that of an individual's quality of life in their final years as they face old age or terminal illness.

Decline can be managed through multiple means, including public or industrial policy efforts such as government provision of retraining.

See also
 Palliative
 State collapse

References

Business terms
Industrial policy